Kharajgil Rural District is a rural district (dehestan) in Asalem District, Talesh County, Gilan Province, Iran. At the 2006 census, its population was 8,586, in 1,920 families. The rural district has 33 villages.

References 

Rural Districts of Gilan Province
Talesh County